Naduvula Konjam Pakkatha Kaanom, abbreviated as NKPK, is a 2012 Indian Tamil-language black comedy film, written and directed by Balaji Tharaneetharan in his directorial debut. Produced by V. S. Rajkumar under the studio Leo Vision, it was distributed by J. Satish Kumar, under his banner JSK Film Corporation. It stars Vijay Sethupathi, Gayathrie, Vigneshwaran Palanisamy, Bagavathi Perumal and Rajkumar, thus marking the acting debut for Rajkumar, Vigneshwaran and Bagavathi. The plot is based on a true story that involves a young man who experiences retrograde amnesia after a cricket incident two days before his wedding.

The music and background score of the film are composed by Ved Shankar and Siddharth Vipin respectively. The cinematography of the film was handled by C. Premkumar and editing was done by R. Govindaraj. The film released on 30 November 2012 to widely positive reviews from critics, and became a cult hit. Owing to the film's success, it was remade in six languages as Pusthakamlo Konni Pageelu Missing (Telugu), Kwatle Satisha (Kannada), Medulla Oblangata (Malayalam), Suna Pila Tike Screw Dhila (Odia), Shu Thayu? (Gujarati) and Dokyala Shot (Marathi).

Plot 
C. Prem Kumar, Saras, Balaji Tharaneetharan alias Bhaji, and Bagavathi Perumal alias Bucks are close friends. Prem is about to be married to his fiancée Dhanalakshmi. Two days before his marriage, the group of friends decide to play a game of cricket. During the game, Prem attempts to catch a ball hit by Bhaji but instead, he drops it and falls on the back of his head but gets back up and says he is fine. After the game, the friends realise that Prem has been muttering the events leading to his injury over and over again. Initially, they think Prem is trying to prank them but later at Bucks' house, they realise that something is wrong. They realise that Prem is suffering from temporary memory loss due to the injury and has forgotten the past year of his life including his upcoming marriage, Dhana, and even his bike that was stolen a few days back. However, he still recognises his friends.

Worried, the trio takes Prem to a local hospital where the doctor diagnoses him with anterograde amnesia or short-term memory loss and checks him into the hospital. They decide to keep his parents and Dhana in the dark. Bucks' boss arrives at the hospital and recounts the story of a man he knew who developed amnesia after an accident and never recovered. Petrified, the trio decides to leave Bhaji in charge of Prem for the night with the hope he will recover the next day but the following morning he continues to remain in the same condition. With his wedding reception that evening and the doctor not allowing him to get discharged, Prem is snuck out of the hospital by the trio. They take him to a hair salon to get him ready for the marriage but are shocked to see Prem's father there. However, they manage to keep Prem's condition a secret from him. They then take him to his home and luckily nobody suspects anything amiss.

At the wedding reception, the trio finds it challenging to keep Dhana and Prem together since he remembers nothing about her. He keeps remarking how awful Dhana looks, much to her dismay; however, the friends are able to control the situation. Much to Bhaji and Bucks' surprise, Prem starts to obey Saras' commands without questioning. Later that night, Saras reveals that he helped Prem complete his schoolwork during high school and since then Prem has always respected Saras more than anyone. The next day at the marriage, the trio finds themselves in a fix when Prem refuses to tie the wedding knot citing the reason that he does not know Dhana and says he cannot forget about a girl he once liked in school. Miraculously, after much persuasion by Saras, he ties the wedding knot. Tears of happiness flow from the friends' eyes, however, their relief is temporary as Prem's condition worsens.

The trio take Prem back to the hospital where they are reprimanded by the doctor for sneaking him out. However, he is surprised to know that the wedding was a success. He realises that Prem has not slept well the past few days and gives him sleeping pills to help him sleep. The next day Prem's condition seems to be the same but later he recounts everything revealing he has recovered and that his memory is back. The friends celebrate, much to Prem's confusion. He is surprised to know that his wedding is over and laments how much he looked forward to his wedding but now is unable to remember it. Finally, the elated friends return home with Prem.

Cast

Production 
The film was said to be based on a real-life incident that happened in the life of cinematographer C. Prem Kumar and described as a humorous tale about a young man who forgets a few days of his life even as he is about to get married. Prem Kumar lost his memory, when he was working as an assistant cameraman in the film Vaaranam Aayiram; two days before his marriage he went to play cricket with three friends, Saras, Bagavathi Perumal (one of the actors), Balaji Tharaneetharan (The director), while Prem attempting a catch, he fell, losing his memory temporarily. Balaji Tharaneetharan, who was present with him, began writing a script based on the incident, besides directing it as well. One of the other witnesses, Bagavathi Perumal agreed to play himself in the film, while the victim Prem Kumar handled the cinematography himself. It took two months for lead actor Vijay Sethupathi to master a lengthy dialogue that begins with the lines "Enna aachu? Cricket valadnom? Nee thane ball potte? Slip aaitena? Keezha vizhundhutena? Okay okay" (What happened? We played cricket? You threw the ball? Did I slip and fall? Okay okay).

Soundtrack 

The film's soundtrack was composed by Ved Shankar, a former student of KM Music Conservatory, a music school led by A. R. Rahman. Ved Shankar had composed earlier two soundtracks Paalai (2011) and Madhubana Kadai (2012), before this film. The background score was composed by Siddharth Vipin. The album features five tracks, including an instrumental, with lyrics penned by Karthik Netha and the composer himself. The film created a record of sorts by featuring a song, the lines of which were selected from phrases sent in by more than 1,800 people through Facebook.

The soundtrack was released on 26 October 2012 at Sathyam Cinemas in Chennai, in the presence of the film's cast and crew, with Kamal Haasan being the event's chief guest. Singer-actress Andrea Jeremiah lent her voice for the promo song "O Crazy Minnal", the music video of which was also shot on her and was released to the media in early November. The songs, except the title track were used only for promotional purposes and were not featured in the film, as they were removed from the film's final cut in order to make the film more interesting."

The soundtrack received generally positive reviews. Behindwoods stated "A playful and innovative soundtrack from Ved Shankar, which definitely stands out from the general commercial albums", providing a rating of 3.5 out of 5.

Release 
Naduvula Konjam Pakkatha Kaanom was due for release on 19 September 2012, with preview screenings being held for critics and personalities from the film industry. The film received positive reviews from the media and various directors and technicians. Following its positive reception, the team decided to postpone the film's release in order to achieve a wider release. Furthermore, about 25 minutes of the film were removed after the premiere shows to make it more interesting. All songs barring the title track were also cut from final version and aired on television for promotional purposes only. To promote the film, the crew created an online game that could be played on the film's website. The distribution rights were acquired by Sathyam Cinemas. The satellite rights were sold to Sun TV. The film eventually released on 30 November 2012 alongside Red Giant Movies' Neerparavai.

Reception 

Naduvula Konjam Pakkatha Kaanom opened to positive reviews from the critics. M. Suganth from Times of India gave it 4 out of 5 and called it an "instant cult comedy that delivers the laughs big time" and added that "the film's real success lies in the genuine rush of feel-good emotion it leaves you with as it ends; it is at once a relief and a celebration".
K. R. Manigandan from The Hindu wrote that the film was "a winner whichever way you choose to look at it. With just a simple story and a small team of talented newcomers, director Balaji Tharaneetharan has, on a shoestring budget, managed to deliver what even major banners with their big budgets and huge star casts often struggle to make — a wholesome entertainer". Sify labelled the film as a "rollicking all new comedy entertainer" and lauded the director for having "come out with no big names, no sleaze, no irrelevant comedy track just pure comedy for the intelligent audiences". Vivek Ramz from in.com rated it 3.5 out of 5 and wrote that "NKPK is jolly, good, fun ride for those who love offbeat entertainers. Go and have a blast!"  IBNLive described the film as "simple, straightforward and hilarious" and gave "three cheers to the whole team for making a clean and a good entertainer". Malini Mannath from The New Indian Express named it a "thorough entertainer" and a "must- watch". A review from Samay Live said the movie as "Best comedy film of the year" and added as "movie highlights the importance of situational comedy and uses it to build one of the best entertaining screenplay of recent times". Behindwoods.com rated the film 3/5 and said "The missing pages are more exciting. Worth the watch". Pavithra Srinivasan from Rediff give 3/5 and cited director Balaji Tharaneetharan as the hero of the film, who "brings us a novel idea in a light-hearted setting, engages our attention with smart dialogues, and pulls off the caper with neat plot twists". Haricharan Pudipeddi from Nowrunning.com gave 3.1 out of 5 and said it was "undoubtedly one of the best situational comedies of the year".

Awards 
 7th Vijay Awards
 Vijay Award For Best Debut Director – Balaji Tharaneetharan
 Special Jury Award – Vijay Sethupathi

Remakes 
Naduvula Konjam Pakkatha Kaanom was remade in several Indian languages:

 Telugu – Pusthakamlo Konni Pageelu Missing (2013)
 Kannada – Kwatle Satisha (2014)
 Malayalam – Medulla Oblangata (2014)
 Odia – Suna Pila Tike Screw Dhila (2017)
 Gujarati – Shu Thayu? (2018).
 Marathi – Dokyala Shot (2019)

References

External links 
 

Tamil films remade in other languages
Films scored by Ved Shankar
Films scored by Siddharth Vipin
2012 black comedy films
Indian films based on actual events
2012 films
2010s Tamil-language films
Indian black comedy films
Indian comedy thriller films
Comedy films based on actual events
Films about amnesia
2012 directorial debut films
2010s comedy thriller films